The following highways are numbered 618:

Costa Rica
 National Route 618

United States

Canada